The Commission scolaire de Montréal (CSM Montreal school board), was a board from 1998 until 2020, as a result of a law passed by the Quebec government that changed the school board system from religious denomination to linguistic denomination.

Its main predecessor is the Montreal Catholic School Commission (Commission des écoles catholiques de Montréal or CÉCM) which was composed of both French and English Roman Catholic schools and had been in operation for over 150 years.

The CSDM operated until 2020 129 elementary schools, 37 secondary schools, 13 adult education centres, and 9 vocational training centres and 28 schooling service centres.

2000's issues
School board elections took place on Sunday, November 2, 2014. The position of chairman has been chosen by universal suffrage. This is for a four-year term. The last school board elections took place in 2007.
The Mouvement pour une école moderne et ouverte keep all positions; president (Catherine Harel-Bourdon) and the 13 new chairs.

In November 2014 Yves Bolduc, the Minister of Education, Recreation and Sports of Quebec, suggested moving Ahuntsic – Cartierville, Côte-des-Neiges, Notre-Dame-de-Grâce, Le Sud-Ouest, and Westmount from the CSDM to the Commission scolaire Marguerite-Bourgeoys (CSMB), which would move 66 schools away from the CDSM, and therefore 30% of the total students of the CSDM. Some students would also move to the Commission scolaire de la Pointe-de-l'Île (CSPÎ).

François Cardinal of La Presse criticized the deal, saying that it was penalizing the CSDM and unfairly rewarding the CSMB.

List of schools

Elementary schools 

 École Arc-en-Ciel
 École Au Pied-de-La-Montagne
 École Barclay
 École Bedford
 École Champlain
 École Des Cinq-Continents
 École Des Nations
 École du Petit-Chapiteau
 École Élan
École FACE (Also a High School)
 École Félix-Leclerc
 École François de Laval
 École Garneau
 École Internationale de Montréal primaire
 École Iona
 École Jean-Batispte-Meilleur
 École La Mennais
 École La Petite-Patrie
 École Lambert-Closse
 École Lanaudière
 École Laurier
 École Le Plateau
 École Les-Enfants-Du-Monde
 École Louis-Hippolyte-Lafontaine
 École Lucille-Teasdale
 École Madeleine-De-Verchères
 École Marc-Favreau
 École Marguerite-Bourgeoys
 École Marie-Favery
 École Notre-Dame-des-Neiges
 École Paul-Bruchési
 École Philippe-Labarre
 École Saint-Anselme
 École Saint-Enfant-Jésus
 École Saint-Étienne
 École Saint-Léon-De-Westmount
 École Saint-Louis-de-Gonzague
 École Saint-Pascal-Baylon
 École Saint-Pierre-Claver
 École Simonne-Monet

High schools
Académie Dunton
Académie de Roberval
École Chomedey-De Maisonneuve
École de la Lancée
École de la Source
École Édouard-Montpetit
École Espace-Jeunesse
École secondaire Eulalie-Durocher
École Eurêka
École Évangeline
École FACE
École Georges-Vanier
École Honoré-Mercier
École internationale de Montréal
École Irénée-Lussier
École Jeanne-Mance
École Joseph-Charbonneau
École secondaire Joseph-François-Perrault
École La Dauversière
École le Tremplin
École le Vitrail
École la Voie
École Louis-Joseph-Papineau
École Louis-Riel
École Louise-Trichet
École Lucien-Pagé
École secondaire Marguerite-De Lajemmerais
École secondaire Marie-Anne

École Pierre-Dupuy
École Robert-Gravel
École Rosalie-Jetté
École Saint-Henri
École Saint-Louis
École Saint-Luc
 École Sophie-Barat

See also

Centre de services scolaire de Montréal

References

Historical school districts in Quebec
Education in Montreal